George Edward Bellows Hill (April 24, 1907 in Boston, Massachusetts – September 17, 1992 in Kentfield, California) was an American figure skater who competed in single skating and pair skating. As a pair skater, he was the 1933, 1935, 1936, and 1937 U.S. national champion with partner Maribel Vinson. As a single skater, he was the 1930, 1931, 1934, and 1936 U.S. bronze medalist.

He competed in singles at the 1931 World Figure Skating Championships, where he placed 11th. He represented the United States at the 1936 Winter Olympics in both singles and pairs. He placed 22nd in singles and 5th in pairs with Vinson.

He graduated from Harvard College in 1933 and from Massachusetts Institute of Technology in 1937.

Competitive highlights

Single skating

Pair skating with Vinson

References

 
   

American male single skaters
American male pair skaters
Figure skaters at the 1936 Winter Olympics
Olympic figure skaters of the United States
1907 births
2002 deaths
Figure skaters from Boston
20th-century American people
21st-century American people
Harvard College alumni
Massachusetts Institute of Technology alumni